Mysore Paper Mill Limited or the MPM is situated at Bhadravathi in the Shimoga district of Karnataka state, India. It was established in the year 1936 by Nalvadi Krishnaraja Wodeyar, the then Maharaja of Mysore state. In 1977, the company became a government company. The company obtained ISO certification in the year 2004.

Closure 
MPM closed functioning in 2016. Government wants to privatise the company while workers want the government to revive it. Some workers opted for voluntary retirement scheme. Company has issued tenders for disposal of materials

See also
VISL
Shimoga

References

External links 
 Official website of the company

Companies based in Karnataka
Pulp and paper companies of India
Government-owned companies of India
Buildings and structures in Shimoga district
Indian companies established in 1936
Indian companies disestablished in 2016
Companies listed on the Bombay Stock Exchange